DYCL-TV (channel 10) is a television station in Tacloban City, Philippines, airing programming from the GMA network. Owned and operated by the network's namesake corporate parent alongside GTV outlet DYBJ-TV (channel 26). The station maintains hybrid analog and digital transmitting facility atop Mt. Canlais, Brgy. Basper, Tacloban City.

History
In 1987, DYCL-TV was opened for soft launch, along with a new identity as GMA Radio-Television Arts, though Republic Broadcasting System remained as its corporate name 14 years later. The relaunched of GMA, aside from sporting a light blue square logo with the network name in white, also had the using of the circle 10 logo, in its final years the blue circle 10 logo used was similar to those used by the ABC in some United States cities (later used the rainbow colors of red, yellow, green and blue stripes, as GMA prepares for a network reformatting).

GMA Tacloban went commercial broadcast in 1988 as DYCL-TV Channel 10 Tacloban, the first regional television station in Eastern Visayas, with some localized news programs until it became a relay station of DYSS-TV 7 Cebu in 1992. The station's transmitter was at 5-kilowatt radius; thus it covers Tacloban City and nearby islands.

On April 30, 1992, as part of the network's expansion of coverage, which started exactly four years after with the inauguration of the station's Tower of Power in its flagship station in Quezon City, Metro Manila, DYCL-TV was introduced of the Rainbow Satellite network launch, which commences its nationwide satellite broadcast to bring live programs from Manila-sourced national programmings via DZBB-TV, GMA's flagship TV station in Manila, to viewers in the Eastern Visayas region. With the launch, GMA utilizes a new logo to correspond with the rebranding and a satellite-beaming rainbow in a multicolored striped based on the traditional scheme of red, orange, yellow, green, blue, indigo and violet, with GMA in a metallic form uses a San Serif Century Gothic Extra Font and analogous gloominess of Indigo as its fonts in the letters.

In 1999, GMA Tacloban became a satellite-selling station from GMA TV-7 Cebu and began simulcasting the first regional newscast Balitang Bisdak.

On December 31, 2021, GMA Tacloban commenced its ISDB-T digital test broadcasts on UHF Channel 34, covering Tacloban City and the provinces of Leyte and Samar.

GMA TV-10 Tacloban local programs
Balitang Bisdak - flagship regional newscast (simulcast over TV-7 Cebu)
GMA Regional TV Live! - flagship regional morning show (simulcast over TV-7 Cebu)

Digital television

Digital channels
UHF Channel 34 (593.143 MHz)

Areas of coverage

Primary areas 
 Tacloban
 Leyte

Secondary areas 
 Samar
 Portion of Biliran
 Portion of Southern Leyte
 Portion of Sorsogon

Rebroadcasters
DYCL-TV's programming is relayed to the following stations across the Eastern Visayas.

References

See also
 DYSS-TV
 List of GMA Network stations

GMA Network stations
Television channels and stations established in 1987
Television stations in Tacloban
Digital television stations in the Philippines